The cédula de identidade is the official national identity document in Brazil. It is often informally called carteira de identidade (identity card), "RG" (from Registro Geral, General Registry) or simply identidade in Portuguese. The card contains the name of the bearer, filiation, place of birth, date of birth, signature and thumbprint of the bearer. Other national documents can legally be used as an identity card, such as a federative unit-issued driver's license, passport or, for minors, a birth certificate. Each card has a unique RG number. As of 11 January 2023, the CPF number will be used as the RG number on new identity cards.

Brazilian identity cards can be used as travel documents to enter the Mercosur members and associated countries (except Guyana and Suriname).

Issuance
Having and carrying an RG card is not compulsory under law, but it is compulsory to carry some form of identification, so it is common for all citizens to have and carry one.

Its issuance is the responsibility of the governments of the federative units of Brazil and are valid nationwide. There is no legal restriction on having more than one identity card, provided each one is issued by a different federative units.

The documents required to obtaining an identity card depend on whether the applicant is single, married or naturalized. Single people need a birth certificate (the original or a certified copy), while married people can use their marriage certificate, and naturalized people can use a naturalization certificate.

Since 11 January 2023, applicants are required to have a CPF number to obtain an identity card. If an applicant does not have a CPF number, the issuing authority will register a CPF for the applicant.

Appearance

There is a national standard form of the card, but each issuing federative unit may introduce minor adjustments, usually concerning the numbering scheme, font, and the respective seal. The card printed in security paper measures 170x60 mm open and 85x60 mm closed, whereas the card in polycarbonate format measures 85.6x53.98 mm  As of 2017, cards are no longer laminated and laminating new cards is forbidden, as they have machine-readable information printed on the inside. Bearers may protect their IDs by storing them in a small plastic cover that is issued with the card.

Contents

Front
 Registration number, which for identity cards issued after 11 January 2023, is the CPF number
 CPF number
 Issue date
 Full name of the bearer
 Filiation (the legal ascendant(s))
 Birthplace (locality and the federated unit code, or country of birth – if born abroad or is naturalised)
 Birth date
 Base document:
CN: Birth Certificate (Certidão de Nascimento)
CC: Marriage Certificate (Certidão de Casamento)
Portaria Ministerial XXXX/XX (Ministerial Order - Ministry of Justice no. of Decree/Year of Naturalization)

Back
 Federated unit coat of arms
 Full name of issuing federated unit
 Name of issuing federation secretariat
 A 3x4 cm photograph of the bearer
 Thumbprint
 Signature or an observation waiving it (for an illiterate bearer)

Legal status
An identity card is commonly required for activities including obtaining a driver's license, opening a bank account, buying or selling real estate, financing debts, applying for a job, giving testimony in court, and entering some public buildings. The police may ask to see the identity card of anyone who is detained, arrested, or searched.

There is no penalty for not carrying an identity card or another valid identification document, but the police are entitled to escort a person found without one to a police station for a search of electronic police records and a criminal background check.

Substitute identity documents
Several other documents are acceptable instead of the identity card, including a federative unit-issued driver's license, passport, professional identity card issued by a trade union, military identity card, civil servant identity card or worker's registry. The actual driver's license contains RG and CPF numbers and can substitute both.

All documents accepted in lieu of a federative unit-issued identity card include a reference to the RG number of the federative unit that issued the identity card. A standard federative unit-issued ID is required to obtain a passport, professional ID, driver's license or any other kind of substitute ID. Once an individual is registered with an RG, they can use a substitute document to register in any federative unit.

Portuguese citizens
Since Decree No. 70.391 in 1972, Portuguese citizens benefiting from equal citizenship status are eligible for regular Brazilian identity cards. They enjoy a reciprocal special regimen in recognition of Brazil and Portugal's special relationship. They bear the writing Nacionalidade Portuguesa - Decreto nº 70.391/72, meaning "Portuguese nationality - Decree No. 70.391/72".

Future
Registro de Identidade Civil (RIC)
Federal Law 9,454/1997 called for the merging of the federative unit-level registration systems into a unified registry. This will likely require merging the RG numbers with the new RIC (Registro de Identidade Civil) numbering system.

The Federal Police has proposed a new ID card with a standard design to go with the changes. The new card has security features to deter counterfeiting; the introduction of an embedded Near field communication (NFC) chip is also being considered.

In February 2017, the Chamber of Deputies approved the project to put the new ID card into force, which will be called Identificação Civil Nacional''.

Documento Nacional de Identidade (DNI)
On April 5, 2017, the Senate Constitution and Justice Commission approved the bill with the proposal to gather the data of the General Registry (RG), National Driver's License (CNH), Individuals Registry (CPF) and the Electoral Title in a single document. After approval by Congress, the law was sanctioned by former President Michel Temer on May 11, 2017, and published in the Diário Oficial da União the next day.

The new Brazilian identity document gathers all of a citizen's information into a single document. However, the inclusion of the National Driver's License was banned from the original text, due to the possible need for retention by transit agencies and also the Passport, since it is a requirement of other countries as a single document.

The database is called "Identificação Civil Nacional" (ICN), while the document will be called "Documento Nacional de Identidade" (DNI). The responsibility for managing the data of the single document shall be the Superior Electoral Court.

The pilot project was launched on February 5, 2018.

On February 11, 2019, the Secretary of Digital Government of the Ministry of Economy, Luis Felipe Salin Monteiro, announced the use of the CPF as a general number, as a first step for the general implementation of DNI in Brazil.

New unified identity card
As per the Decree  10,977 of 23 February 2022 a new ID card will be issued, and all 26 states and the Federal District are required to issue the new ID card starting 6 November 2023.

The CPF number, which all Brazilian citizens have already got for tax purposes, will be the ID card number.

Any applicant will choose between two physical versions: a modern plastic ID-1 card or a classic paper-based card. Applicants who choose the plastic-based card must sign a declaration recording their choice. The paper-based version of the ID card can be issued until 1 March 2032, but issuing authorities can stop issuing the paper version before this date.

A digital version will be available on portable devices, such as smartphones.

Applicants who have a previous version of the ID card can apply for the new ID card free of cost.

The previous versions of the ID card will continue to be valid for 10 years starting from the date of publication of the Decree  10,977, that is, until 23 February 2032, except for people over 60 years old, whose ID cards remain valid indefinitely.

See also
 CPF number
 Brazilian passport
 Brazilian nationality law
 Visa requirements for Brazilian citizens
 Visa policy of Brazil

References

National identity cards by country
Government of Brazil